Esperando el milagro is the ninth album by Argentine rock band Las Pelotas. An EP ("Maxi") was released in 2002, to promote "Esperando el milagro" - it features songs "Desaparecido", "Si sentís" and "La creciente".

Track listing 
 Será [It Will Be]
 Mareada [Dizzy]
 Tomas x
 Desaparecido [Missing]
 Día feliz [Happy Day]
 Abejas [Bees]
 Si sentís [If You Feel]
 Tormenta en Júpiter [Storm On Jupiter]
 Rey de los divinos [King Of The Divines]
 Esperando el milagro [Waiting For The Miracle]
 Tiempo de matar [Time To Kill]
 La creciente [The Rising Tide]
 Puede ser [It Can Be]

2003 albums